Harvey railway station is located on the South Western Railway in Western Australia. It serves the town of Harvey.

History
Harvey station opened in August 1893 shortly after the South Western Railway was extended from Pinjarra to Bunbury.

In 1936, the station was extended and the building improved with rustic weatherboards to the exterior and the roof tiled. Harvey's timber, dairy, beef and other agricultural commodities trade, including from the irrigated dairy industry, ensured busy goods traffic at the station.
Passenger traffic at the station was substantial well into the 1970's. Harvey was serviced by both the iconic 'Australind' passenger service as well as the early-morning Bunbury Belle shopper - both of which ran between Perth and Bunbury. The advent of greatly improved road linkages on the South West Highway and the efficiency of road-based transport saw usage of the line progressively decline from the 1970's onwards.

The station became unattended in 1984 with the building now housing the Harvey Railway Station Museum. In 2000, a high-level platform was built as part of a disability upgrade.

The station is today still served by Transwa's twice daily Australind service. Various proposals have been floated for the establishment of a new 'fast-train' service over the 160 km route between Perth and Bunbury - however, this may involve the extension of the coastal route on the new electrified line currently terminating at Mandurah. It is therefore uncertain whether the old Harvey Station will be part of future plans to improve regional train services in Western Australia

References

External links
Harvey Station History of Western Australian Railways & Stations gallery

Railway stations in Western Australia
Railway stations in Australia opened in 1893
South Western Railway, Western Australia